Morris Doob (March 22, 1907 – March 26, 1966) was an American sports shooter. He competed in the 25 m pistol event at the 1936 Summer Olympics.

References

1907 births
1966 deaths
American male sport shooters
Olympic shooters of the United States
Shooters at the 1936 Summer Olympics
Sportspeople from Cincinnati